The 1950 United Kingdom general election in Northern Ireland was held on 23 February as part of the wider general election. The Representation of the People Act 1948 reorganised constituencies: all MPs were now elected single-seat constituencies using FPTP, ending the two-seat constituencies which had been in place till then, and the university constituency of Queen's University of Belfast was abolished.

Results
In the election as a whole, the Labour Party led by Clement Attlee as Prime Minister was returned with a narrow majority, while the Conservative Party, which included the Ulster Unionists, led by Sir Winston Churchill, continued in opposition.

MPs elected

Footnotes

References

1950
1950 elections in Northern Ireland
Northern Ireland